Chicago XI is the ninth studio album, and eleventh album overall, by the American band Chicago. It was released on September 12, 1977 through Columbia Records. It was both the last to feature guitarist and vocalist Terry Kath prior to his death in a gun accident just over four months later, and the last to be produced by longtime associate of the band James William Guercio.

Chicago XI was a commercial and critical success for the band, reaching the top 10 in the US and garnering generally positive reviews. Three singles were released from the album—"Baby, What a Big Surprise", "Little One", and "Take Me Back to Chicago"—with the former reaching number four on the Billboard Hot 100. Chicago XI would become the band's last album to make the top 10 until Chicago 16 in 1982.

Background
According to the web site Ultimate Classic Rock, Chicago XI seems like a collection of solo songs rather than the work of the ensemble whole Chicago had been earlier in the 1970s. Peter Cetera aimed to replicate the success of the Grammy-winning "If You Leave Me Now" with "Baby, What a Big Surprise", which proved to be the album's biggest hit, going to No. 4 on the Billboard Hot 100. This was his only writing contribution to the album and, quite atypically, the only song with him on lead vocals. Terry Kath revived his old live favorite "Mississippi Delta City Blues" for the album, while turning in a touching vocal on Danny Seraphine's "Little One." Seraphine also co-wrote "Take Me Back to Chicago", which charted at No. 63. Kath, who was planning a forthcoming solo album, may have intended "Takin' It On Uptown" — which, besides some uncredited backup singers, possibly features only Kath himself — as a solo album "preview" along the lines of Lamm's "Skinny Boy" on Chicago VII. James Pankow sang lead on his own "Till The End of Time," as did Lee Loughnane on his original, "This Time." The once-prolific Robert Lamm contributed only two songs, the sympathetic "Policeman" and "Vote For Me."

The cover design for the album is called "Regional Map" on the group's official web site.

Upon its September 1977 release, Chicago XI (Columbia 34860) reached No. 6 in the US on the Billboard 200, stayed in the charts for 20 weeks and went platinum in October the same year. It did not chart in the UK.

In her review of the album for The Sydney Morning Herald, Christine Hogan said, "If there had never been a Chicago X, this album would have been the best ever made by these perennials." Writing for the Wilmington, Delaware Evening Journal, Hugh Cutler called the album a "critical and commercial triumph" and said it even drew a "rave review" from Rolling Stone magazine.

Record World described the single "Little One" as "a mid-tempo love song," saying that "the brass and vocal arrangements stand out as always."

While recording Chicago XI, longtime producer James William Guercio's smothering artistic control had reached its breaking point, with the band deciding to take their career into their own hands and strike out on their own after finishing the album with him. However, as big a change in their career as Guercio's dismissal would be for Chicago, it would be minor in comparison to the tragedy that awaited them.

On January 23, 1978, a few months after Chicago XIs release, Terry Kath, regarded by many as the "soul" of Chicago, accidentally and fatally shot himself during a party at roadie Don Johnson's house.  A gun enthusiast, Kath attempted to calm the guests' surprise when—while reportedly inebriated—he pulled out his gun to clean it by demonstrating that it was unloaded and promptly pointed the gun to his head and pulled the trigger, not realizing a bullet was in the chamber.  The remaining members of Chicago were shocked and devastated by Kath's death, and even considered breaking up.  After a few weeks of mourning, they decided to move on, thus beginning a new era in the band's history.  They would recruit singer/guitarist Donnie Dacus for the follow-up, Hot Streets.

In 2002, Chicago XI was remastered and reissued by Rhino Records with rehearsal recordings of Pankow's "Wish I Could Fly" (backing track) and Lamm's "Paris" as bonus tracks.

Track listing

Personnel

Chicago 
 Robert Lamm – acoustic piano, Hammond organ, clavinet, Fender Rhodes, lead and backing vocals
 Terry Kath – electric guitars, acoustic guitars, percussion, lead and backing vocals
 Peter Cetera – bass, lead and backing vocals
 James Pankow – trombone, keyboards, percussion, vocals, brass arrangements
 Walter Parazaider – saxophones, flute, clarinet
 Lee Loughnane – trumpet, piccolo trumpet, flugelhorn, vocals
 Danny Seraphine – drums, percussion
 Laudir de Oliveira – percussion

Additional personnel 
 David "Hawk" Wolinski – ARP synthesizer on "Take Me Back to Chicago"; Fender Rhodes on "Little One'
 James William Guercio – acoustic guitars and bass on "Baby, What a Big Surprise"
 Tim Cetera – additional backing vocals on "Baby, What a Big Surprise"
 Carl Wilson – additional backing vocals on "Baby, What a Big Surprise"
 Chaka Khan – backing vocals and incredible preach at end of "Take Me Back to Chicago"
 Dominic Frontiere – orchestral conception and orchestration on "Baby, What a Big Surprise"; orchestration for "The Inner Struggles of a Man"; string and orchestral arrangements for "Little One"
 The Voices of Inspiration – choir on "Vote for Me"

Production 
 Producer – James William Guercio
 Audio engineer – Wayne Tarnowski
 Assistant engineer – Tom Likes
 Strings recorded by Armin Steiner at Sound Labs (Hollywood, California).
 Audio mastering – Mike Reese at The Mastering Lab (Los Angeles, California).
 Album cover design – John Berg
 Logo design – Nick Fasciano
 Inside photography – Reid Miles

Charts

Singles

References

Notes

Chicago (band) albums
1977 albums
Albums produced by James William Guercio
Columbia Records albums
Albums with cover art by Reid Miles